Dingwall Trust is a Child, Youth and Family approved support service based in Papatoetoe, Auckland, New Zealand. The Trust is a multi-programme agency that provides care for children and young people referred there by private families and government agencies and works with families in their own homes.

The Dingwall Presbyterian Orphanage Trust Board was founded in 1927 on the execution of David Dingwall's will. In March 2005, the organisation celebrated its 75th anniversary.

School
The Dingwall Trust School opened in 1996 after operating as a home schooling unit from October 1993 with Anne Stevens as the head teacher.

See also
Children, Young Persons, and Their Families Act 1989
Presbyterian Church of Aotearoa New Zealand
Child, Youth and Family (New Zealand)

References

External links
Dingwall Trust website

Organisations based in Auckland